Lazar Iosifovich Lagin, real name Lazar Ginzburg (4 December 1903, Vitebsk – 4 June 1979, Moscow), was a Soviet and Russian author of children's and science fiction books.

Lagin is best known for his ever-popular book Starik Hottabych (Старик Хоттабыч, Old Man Hottabych, 1938), a fairy tale telling the story of a genie who is freed from captivity by a Soviet schoolboy. The genie, as is to be expected, has some trouble in adapting to modern life values and technological development. The book was recommended to school libraries by Ministry of general and professional education of Russian Federation; it was made into the film Old Khottabych in 1956.

Lagin's science fiction novels are set in imaginary Western "capitalist" countries and satirize misuse of scientific inventions in bourgeois society. His novella Major Well Andyou (Майор Велл Эндъю) is a satiric sequel to H. G. Wells' The War of the Worlds.

Lagin was also a screenplay writer, producing, for instance, the screenplay for the 1967 animation film Passion of Spies.

In English 
The Old Genie Hottabych, Fredonia Books, 2001.

In Hindi 
 Beeswin sadi ka jinn. New Delhi, Rajkamal publications. Translated by famous Hindi writer Kamleshwar.

External links 
 The Old Genie Hottabych from Archive.org (free pdf, kindle etc.)
 Full English text of The Old Genie Hottabych
 Lazar Lagin biography on the Belarus SIG Newsletters, by Vitaly Charny

1903 births
1979 deaths
20th-century Russian male writers
Communist Party of the Soviet Union members
Writers from Vitebsk
Recipients of the Order of the Red Banner of Labour
Russian children's writers
Russian fantasy writers
Russian Jews
Russian male writers
Russian novelists
Russian science fiction writers
Socialist realism writers
Soviet children's writers
Soviet fantasy writers
Soviet Jews
Soviet male writers
Soviet novelists
Soviet science fiction writers
Yiddish-language writers
Burials at Kuntsevo Cemetery
Krokodil editors
20th-century pseudonymous writers